The Sapling Foundation is a non-profit organization that owned the TED global conference, from 1996 to June 2019. It was founded by Chris Anderson in 1996.

Overview
The organization describes its purpose as follows:

In 2015, Anderson served as president, without compensation, and Thomas Valentino served as CFO and Secretary. The Sapling Foundation's 2015 revenue was about $66 million, of which about $23 million was contributions and about $42 million was TED conference revenue.

On July 1, 2019, the TED Conferences LLC was transferred from Sapling Foundation to TED Foundation to "align with our brand and make it easier for our donors to connect TED donations to TED Conferences, LLC."

References

501(c)(4) nonprofit organizations
TED (conference)
Civil liberties advocacy groups in the United States
Non-profit organizations based in New York (state)
1996 establishments in New York (state)